Vester Pegg (May 23, 1889 – February 19, 1951) was an American actor of the silent film era. He appeared in 140 films between 1912 and 1941, mainly Westerns. He was born in Appleton City, Missouri and died in Los Angeles, California.

Pegg became a picador in 1909, working in a bull ring in Mexico City. He left that job after a bull charged and killed the horse on which Pegg was riding. He moved to California, where he began acting in stock theater. After 18 months of acting on stage, he began acting in films, eventually signing with Universal Pictures, where he worked with Harry Carey's company.

Selected filmography

 The Birth of a Nation (1915) - Minor Role (uncredited)
 The Lucky Transfer (1915, Short) - The clerk
 Jordan Is a Hard Road (1915) - (uncredited)
 Blue Blood and Red (1916)
 Intolerance (1916) - Extra (uncredited)
 Blood Money (1917, Short) - Bud Cameron
 The Bad Man of Cheyenne (1917, Short) - Vesta
 The Outlaw and the Lady (1917, Short)
 Goin' Straight (1917, Short) - Pinnacle Bill
 The Fighting Gringo (1917) - Pedro
 Hair-Trigger Burke (1917, Short) - Bill
 A 44-Calibre Mystery (1917, Short) - Pete McGuire
 The Almost Good Man (1917, Short) - Pete Willis
 The Golden Bullet (1917, Short) - Dick Henderson, alias Rogue River Charlie
 The Wrong Man (1917, Short) - Chip Stevens
 The Soul Herder (1917, Short) - Topeka Jack
 Cheyenne's Pal (1917, Short) - Cowboy
 Straight Shooting (1917) - Placer Fremont
 The Texas Sphinx (1917, Short) - Steve
 The Secret Man (1917) - Bill - Molly's Brother
 A Marked Man (1917) - Ben Kent
 Bucking Broadway (1917) - Eugene Thornton
 The Phantom Riders (1918) - The Unknown
 Wild Women (1918) - Pegg
 Thieves' Gold (1918) - Curt Simmons
 The Scarlet Drop (1918) - Marley Calvert
 Hell Bent (1918) - Jack Thurston
 A Woman's Fool (1918) - Tommy Lusk
 The Black Horse Bandit (1919, Short)
 Bare Fists (1919) - Lopez
 The Border Terror - Zorro 
 Riders of Vengeance (1919)
 The Outcasts of Poker Flat (1919)
 Ace of the Saddle (1919) - Gambler
 Rider of the Law (1919) - Nick Kyneton
 Vanishing Trails (1920) - Rankin
 The Galloping Devil (1920) - Pink
 The Fighting Stranger (1921) - Joe Kilburn
 The Last Chance (1921) - Black Sparr
 The Struggle (1921) - Diamond Joe
 The Raiders (1921) - Bob Thiele
 The Kickback (1922) - Ramon Pinellos
 Boomerang Justice (1922)
 Canyon of the Fools (1923) - Knute
 Lone Fighter (1923) - Harvey Bates
 His Own Law (1924)
 The Broken Law (1924)
 The Shield of Silence (1925)
 Wildfire (1925) - (uncredited)
 Rough Going (1925) - Jim Benson
 Tearin' Loose (1925) - Jim
 The Hurricane Horseman (1925) - Jim Marden
 Bucking the Truth (1926) - Sheriff Findlay
 3 Bad Men (1926) - Henchman Shooting Lucas (uncredited)
 Jack O'Hearts (1926)
 The Flying Horseman (1926) - Henchman
 Man of the Forest (1926) - Moses
 The Desert Pirate (1927) - Henchman
 Yellow Contraband (1928) - Dude McClain
 Beyond the Law (1930) - Slade Henchman (uncredited)
 The Dawn Trail (1930) - Mac (uncredited)
 Not Exactly Gentlemen (1931) - Henchman (uncredited)
 The Sunset Trail (1932) - Connors (uncredited)
 Heritage of the Desert (1932) - Naab Man (uncredited)
 Sundown Rider (1932) - Ranch Hand (uncredited)
 Judge Priest (1934) - Joe Herringer (uncredited)
 The Dude Ranger (1934) - Brings Horse (uncredited)
 Elinor Norton (1934) - Ranch Hand (uncredited)
 Carnival (1935) - Small Town Man (uncredited)
 The Little Colonel (1935) - Frontiersman (uncredited)
 The Revenge Rider (1935) - Henchman Thomas (uncredited)
 Party Wire (1935) - Poker Quartet Member (uncredited)
 Steamboat Round the Bend (1935) - Mink - Pride of Paducah Pilot (uncredited)
 Gallant Defender (1935) - Cattleman (uncredited)
 The Prisoner of Shark Island (1936) - Soldier (uncredited)
 Forlorn River (1937) - Deputy Hank (uncredited)
 Wild and Woolly (1937) - Man on Street (uncredited)
 Thunder Trail (1937) - Tate Henchman (uncredited)
 Checkers (1937) - (uncredited)
 Born to the West (1937) - Bartender #2 (uncredited)
 Wells Fargo (1937) - Fargo Rider (uncredited)
 Stagecoach (1939) - Hank Plummer (uncredited)
 Trouble in Sundown (1939) - Posse Rider (uncredited)
 Frontier Pony Express (1939) - Henchman Doyle (uncredited)
 My Little Chickadee (1940) - Gambler (uncredited)
 Prairie Law (1940) - Henchman (uncredited)
 The Ranger and the Lady (1940) - Freighter (uncredited)
 Colorado (1940) - Sam Smith - Henchman
 Under Texas Skies (1940) - Henchman (uncredited)
 West of Abilene (1940) - Kennedy
 Sheriff of Tombstone (1941) - Henchman (uncredited)
 Best Man Wins (1948) - Creditor (uncredited)

References

External links

1889 births
1951 deaths
American male film actors
American male silent film actors
People from Appleton City, Missouri
Male actors from Missouri
20th-century American male actors
Male Western (genre) film actors
American male stage actors